Balta urban hromada, or simply Balta hromada is an urban-type hromada in the Podilsk Raion of Odesa Oblast, Ukraine. It has an area of 1041.8 km2, and a population of 33,740, out of which, 17,854 or 52.91% lives in the main city, Balta.

Settlements 
The hromada is made up of 33 villages and Balta, the administrative center. The list of villages:

References 

Hromadas of Odesa Oblast
Balta Hromada
Hromadas of Ukraine